The 5th Emmy Awards, retroactively known as the 5th Primetime Emmy Awards after the debut of the Daytime Emmy Awards, were presented at the Hotel Statler in Los Angeles, California on February 5, 1953. The ceremonies were hosted by Art Linkletter.

Winners and nominees
Winners are listed first, highlighted in boldface, and indicated with a double dagger (‡).

Programs

Acting

Hosting

References

External links
 Emmys.com list of 1953 Nominees & Winners
 

005
Emmy Awards
Primetime Emmy Awards
Primetime Emmy Awards
Primetime Emmy Awards
Primetime Emmy Awards